Ellingsøya or Ellingsøy is the northernmost island in Ålesund Municipality in Møre og Romsdal county, Norway. The island is located northeast of the town of Ålesund, north of the islands of Nørvøya and Uksenøya, east of the island of Valderøya, and south of the mainland peninsula of Haram. The villages of Hoffland, Årset, and Myklebust are all located on the south side of the island. Ellingsøy Church is the main church for the island.

Ellingsøya used to be accessible from the town of Ålesund only by boat or by road via Skodje Municipality, but the undersea Ellingsøy Tunnel was built in 1987 connecting Ellingsøy to Ålesund (to the south) and the Valderøy Tunnel was also built connecting Ellingsøy to the nearby island of Valderøya in Giske Municipality to the west. The tunnels are accessed in the village of Hoffland on the southwestern part of the island.

Ellingsøya has an association football team, Ellingsøy IL, which currently plays in the 5th division in Norway.

See also
List of islands of Norway

References

External links
 Ellingsøy lower secondary school 

Ålesund
Islands of Møre og Romsdal